James Ramster was the first manager of Hull City Football Club. He was the manager from August 1904 until April 1905. He never managed the team in a competitive match, however, he was in charge during some of the club's first friendly matches before the team competed in the football league. The first friendly match that he took charge of was Hull City's fixture against Notts County on the 1 September 1904. He was followed by Ambrose Langley.

References

Hull City A.F.C. managers
Year of death missing
Year of birth missing